WWE Hall of Fame (2015) was the event which featured the introduction of the 16th class to the WWE Hall of Fame. The event was produced by WWE on March 28, 2015, from the SAP Center in San Jose, California. The event took place the same weekend as WrestleMania 31. The event aired live on the WWE Network, and was hosted by Jerry Lawler. A condensed one-hour version of the ceremony aired the following Monday after Raw, on the USA Network.

Event
Due to the launch of the WWE Network shortly before WrestleMania XXX, this event featured the second ever "Red Carpet" event as a one-hour pre-show prior to the start of the event. The pre-show was hosted by Michael Cole, Maria Menounos, Byron Saxton and Renee Young.

Rikishi was inducted by his sons The Usos (Jimmy and Jey Uso). The Usos spoke about what it was like growing up with their father's rear end being the focus on TV. Following induction, the three recreated the Too Cool dance, including Jimmy doing The Worm on stage.

Larry Zbyszko was inducted by Bruno Sammartino.

Alundra Blayze was inducted by Natalya. Blayze's husband was in attendance, the first time she saw him in nearly a year due to his active role in the military. During Blayze's speech she asked Natalya to come back out so she could make an old wrong right. Natalya brought with her a metal trashcan which she places beside Blayze. Blayze then pulled several gags out before pulling the WWF Women's Championship belt out of the garbage, which she had throw in the garbage twenty years earlier on Monday Nitro.

Following The Ultimate Warrior's death in April 2014,  WWE introduced the Warrior Award, in 2015, for those who have "exhibited unwavering strength and perseverance, and who lives life with the courage and compassion that embodies the indomitable spirit of the Ultimate Warrior." The first Warrior Award was given to Connor Michalek and presented by Warrior's wife Dana, as well as Daniel Bryan. The award was accepted by Connor's father Steve.

The Bushwhackers were inducted by John Laurinaitis.

Tatsumi Fujinami was inducted by Ric Flair, during the induction speech Flair spoke about the matches the two had over the years in Japan.

Randy Savage was inducted by long time friend/foe from both WWE and WCW, Hulk Hogan. Due to Savage's death in 2011 he was inducted posthumously, and his award was accepted on his behalf by his brother Lanny Poffo.

Arnold Schwarzenegger was inducted by Triple H.

Kevin Nash was the final inductee, inducted by longtime friend Shawn Michaels. Following the induction they were joined on stage by fellow members of The Kliq, Scott Hall, Sean Waltman and Triple H.

Inductees

Individual
 Class headliners appear in boldface

Tag team

Celebrity

Warrior Award

References

WWE Hall of Fame ceremonies
2015 in professional wrestling
2015 in California
Events in San Jose, California
Professional wrestling in San Jose, California
March 2015 events in the United States